The Washington Avenue Bridge in Iowa Falls, Iowa is an attractive concrete two-span open spandrel arched bridge that brings Washington Avenue over the Iowa River. Originally it carried US 20.  It was built in 1934 by the Weldon Brothers for $51,710.55.

In the 1920s and 1930s if a relatively long bridge was required in a rural area, it would have been built using steel trusses, but in this urban setting where there is enough height in the bridge to allow wide arches, a concrete open-spandrel arch bridge could be built, and be worthwhile for its attractiveness.  In Iowa, the Mederville Bridge (1918), the Adair Viaduct (1923) and the Iowa Falls Bridge (1928, also built by the Weldon Brothers) are other examples, but the Washington Avenue bridge is notable as a well-preserved two-span example.

It was listed on the National Register of Historic Places in 1998.

See also
 
 
 
 
 List of bridges on the National Register of Historic Places in Iowa
 National Register of Historic Places listings in Hardin County, Iowa

References

Road bridges on the National Register of Historic Places in Iowa
Bridges completed in 1934
Bridges in Hardin County, Iowa
Arch bridges in Iowa
Iowa Falls, Iowa
U.S. Route 20
Bridges of the United States Numbered Highway System
National Register of Historic Places in Hardin County, Iowa
Concrete bridges in the United States
Open-spandrel deck arch bridges in the United States
1934 establishments in Iowa